The 1995–96 Slovak 1.Liga season was the third season of the Slovak 1. Liga, the second level of ice hockey in Slovakia. 12 teams participated in the league, and HK VTJ Spisska Nova Ves won the championship.

Regular season

Qualification round

External links
 Season on hockeyarchives.info

Slovak 1. Liga
Slovak 1. Liga seasons
Liga
Liga